Thomas Vallance (27 May 1856 – 16 February 1935) was a  Scottish football player. He made 38 Scottish Cup appearances for the Rangers  club.

Football
Before football, Vallance was a rower. He was noted as being abnormally tall for the times but was only around six feet two inches. He played at right-back for the Rangers from 1874 to 1882. He left Scotland on 22 February 1882 to take a position in Calcutta. He embarked on a career in the tea plantations of Assam but returned after a year suffering from blackwater fever.

Vallance was also capped at international level, making seven appearances for Scotland between 1877 and 1881.

References

External links
 

1856 births
1935 deaths
Rangers F.C. players
Scottish footballers
Scotland international footballers
Footballers from West Dunbartonshire
Association football fullbacks
People from Renton, West Dunbartonshire